The Arrondissement of Nivelles is an arrondissement in Wallonia and Belgium. It is the only arrondissement in the province of Walloon Brabant, and is coterminous with it. Before 1995, it was one of three arrondissements in the Province of Brabant.

It is both an administrative and a judicial arrondissement, both having the same borders as the province.

Municipalities

The Administrative Arrondissement of Nivelles consists of the following 27 municipalities:

Beauvechain
Braine-l'Alleud
Braine-le-Château
Chastre
Chaumont-Gistoux
Court-Saint-Étienne
Genappe
Grez-Doiceau
Hélécine
Incourt
Ittre
Jodoigne
La Hulpe
Lasne

Mont-Saint-Guibert
Nivelles
Orp-Jauche
Ottignies-Louvain-la-Neuve
Perwez
Ramillies
Rebecq
Rixensart
Tubize
Villers-la-Ville
Walhain
Waterloo
Wavre

See also
Dyle (department)

References

Arrondissements of Walloon Brabant